Bijukumar Damodaran, known mononymously as Dr. Biju, is an Indian homoeopathic doctor turned film director and screenwriter. He is best known for films such as Saira (2005), Veettilekkulla Vazhi (2010), Akasathinte Niram (2012), Perariyathavar (2013), Valiya Chirakulla Pakshikal (2016), Sound of Silence (2017), Painting Life (2018) and Veyilmarangal (2019).

Biju has received three National Film Awards, and his films have been screened at multiple international film festivals and won numerous awards including the Golden Goblet Award for Best Artistic Achievement at the Shanghai Film Festival 2019. His films were screened at festivals including Cannes, Montreal, Shanghai, Telluride, Moscow, Cairo, Iran (Fajr), Eurasia, Almaty, Jeonju, Tallinn, Oporto, Dhaka, IFFK and IFFI.

His upcoming film Adrishya Jalakangal, starring Tovino Thomas and Nimisha Sajayan, is scheduled to release in 2023.

Career 
Biju debuted into films as writer and director with Saira (2005). It was first part of terrorism trilogy and in 2007 premiered at the Cannes International Film Festival. His second film Raman (2008) was selected at Cairo International Film Festival (2009) in the Incredible India category. Veettilekkulla Vazhi (The Way Home; 2010) was last film of the trilogy and earned a National Film Award  for best Malayalam film in 2010.

His fourth film Akasathinte Niram (Color of Sky; 2012), was premiered at 15th Shanghai International Film Festival in the International competition section. Biju's next film, Perariyathavar (Names Unknown, 2014) received two National Film Awards in 2014 for the Best Actor and Best film on Environment conservation, and was screened at the Montreal World Film Festival (2014).

In 2015, he directed Valiya Chirakulla Pakshikal (Birds With Large Wings; 2015) which was premiered at United Nations, Geneva as a part of the United Nations Environment Programme, and received National Film Award (2015) for the Best film on Environment conservation. His 2016 film Kaadu Pookkunna Neram (When The Woods Bloom) was premiered at the Eurasia International Film Festival, Asia Pacific Screen Awards, International Film Festival of Kerala, and the Montreal World Film Festival, in 2016.

In 2016, his next film Kaadu Pookkunna Neram premiered at Montreal World Film Festival (2016). In 2017, Dr.Biju directed his first non-Malayalam in Pahari, Hindi and Tibetan languages. The film Sound of Silence (2017 film) (2017) won the Best Director award at Kolkata International Film Festival (2017).

In 2018, Dr.Biju directed a film in English language titled Painting Life (2018). The film premiered at Montreal World Film Festival (2018). In 2019 Dr.Biju's tenth film Veyilmarangal (2019) premiered at Shanghai International Film Festival (2019). The film won the Golden Goblet award for outstanding artistic achievement.

In 2020, he directed the film House of Orange Trees which premiered at the Kolkata International Film Festival 2020. His next film The Portraits (2021) premiered at the Moscow International film festival 2021. In 2021 he directed his first film in Telugu language titled Sthalam (The Land). The film premiered at Dhaka International Film festival 2023.

Filmography

Awards and honours 

 National Film Awards

 International Awards

 Kerala State Film Awards

References

External links 
 

Indian film directors
Indian homeopaths
Indian male screenwriters
Living people
Malayalam film directors
Malayalam screenwriters
National Film Award (India) winners
Film people from Kerala
Year of birth missing (living people)